Telkwa is a village located along British Columbia Highway 16, nearly  southeast of the town of Smithers and  west of the city of Prince George, in northwest British Columbia, Canada.

History
Settlement in the area began around 1904 in a townsite known as Aldermere on the hill above Telkwa.  Around 1907, people began to move down the hill to be closer to water supplies and the anticipated route of the Grand Trunk Pacific Railway. The name Telkwa is possibly an Indigenous term for "meeting of the waters" which appropriately describes the confluence of the Bulkley and Telkwa Rivers in town.

Demographics 

Religion 
According to the 2021 census, religious groups in Telkwa included:
Irreligion (910 persons or 61.9%)
Christianity (510 persons or 34.7%)
Judaism (15 persons or 1.0%)
Other (35 persons or 2.4%)

Attractions
The history of the town can be explored at the Telkwa Museum and on a tour of the historic former town site of Aldermere. Telkwa hosts an annual barbecue and demolition derby on Labour Day weekend.  The town also has Eddy Park, at the riverside with a small gazebo, right off the highway to sit and have a picnic and watch the Bulkley River go by.
Fort Telkwa Riverfront Accommodations & RV Campground is situated on the Bulkley River just south of Telkwa on Highway 16.  It stretches over a quarter mile along the Bulkley River, world renowned for its Steelhead fishing.  There is a full service gas station, a convenience store and restaurant, building supply store, bar with a cold wine and beer as well as a fish truck on the bank of the Bulkley River at the end of Hankin avenue.

There are 4 trails; The Hunter Basin Road which is 8 km long, Winfield Creek Road Trail, 12.5 km., McDowell Lake Trail 10.5 km and Telkwa Pass Trail 51 km long.

Tyhee Lake and Campground is 2.6 kilometers north east of Telkwa and offers swimming, boating, biking and camping as well as great trout fishing.  Tyhee Lake Provincial Park offers 59 campsites, 2 double sites and 4 tent sites.

Infrastructure

Transportation
Via Rail's Jasper – Prince Rupert train calls at the Telkwa railway station several times per week.

References

External links

Villages in British Columbia
Populated places in the Regional District of Bulkley-Nechako
Bulkley Valley